Femke Boelen (born 5 May 1968) is a retired Dutch rower. In 1994, she won a world title in the coxless fours and finished in fourth place in the coxed eights. Next year she won a bronze medal in the coxed eights; she finished in sixth place in this event at the 1996 Summer Olympics.

Boelen retired from competitions in 1997 and worked as a coach at her rowing club Willem III in Amsterdam. Her father Herman is also an Olympic rower and rowing coach, while her husband is rower Hans Lycklama.

References

1968 births
Living people
Dutch female rowers
Olympic rowers of the Netherlands
Rowers at the 1996 Summer Olympics
Rowers from Amsterdam
World Rowing Championships medalists for the Netherlands
21st-century Dutch women
20th-century Dutch women
20th-century Dutch people